Mossor is a surname. Notable people with the surname include:

 Earl Mossor (1925–1988), American baseball player
 Stefan Mossor (1896–1957), Polish general

See also
 Mosser
 Mossoró, city in Brazil